Kwon Soon-woo was the defending champion but chose not to defend his title.

Christopher O'Connell won the title after defeating Yosuke Watanuki 6–1, 6–7(5–7), 6–3 in the final.

Seeds

Draw

Finals

Top half

Bottom half

References

External links
Main draw
Qualifying draw

Keio Challenger - 1
2022 Men's singles